is a Japanese manga series written and illustrated by Coolkyousinnjya, serialized on Neetsha's webcomic distribution site Weekly Young VIP since January 2008. The remake version written by Coolkyousinnjya and illustrated by Johanne has been serialized in Kodansha's shōnen manga magazine Shōnen Magazine R, as well as the website and app Magazine Pocket, since August 2015 and has been collected in nine tankōbon volumes. The manga is licensed in North America by Kodansha USA. An anime television series adaptation by Asahi Production aired from July to September 2021.

Characters
 / 

 / 

 /

Media

Manga

Anime
An anime television series adaptation of the remake version was announced on August 7, 2020. The series is animated by Asahi Production and directed by Shigeru Ueda, with Keiichirō Ōchi handling series composition, Satomi Kurita and Masato Katō designing the characters, and Takaaki Nakahashi composing the series' music. It aired from July 1 to September 16, 2021 on Tokyo MX, BS NTV, and AT-X. Q-MHz produced the opening theme song, "Dark spiral journey" featuring Yuko Suzuhana, while Mitei no Hanashi performed the ending theme song, "Yoru o Koeru Ashioto" (Footsteps Across the Night). Crunchyroll licensed the series outside of Asia. Medialink has licensed the series in Southeast Asia and South Asia, and is streaming it on their Ani-One YouTube channel, but this series is only viewable on their YouTube channel with Ani-One Ultra Membership scheme. Ani-One will upload this anime to their YouTube channel from July 1 for Hong Kong, Taiwan and Macau and from July 15 for other Asian regions.

Episode list

Notes

References

External links
 
 
 

2021 anime television series debuts
Anime series based on manga
Asahi Production
Crunchyroll anime
Dark fantasy anime and manga
Japanese webcomics
Kodansha manga
Medialink
Seinen manga
Shōnen manga
Tokyo MX original programming
Webcomics in print